= Fouad Abdelmoumni =

Moroccan economist and activist

- Occupations: Economist, Activist
- Board member of: Transparency Maroc (Secretary General)
- Website: Official Website

Fouad Abdelmoumni (Arabic: فؤاد عبد المومني) is a Moroccan human rights activist and economist. He has been the secretary-general of Transparency Maroc since 13 February 2016. He was Director General of the NGO Al Amana from 1997 to 2010.
